The surname Steckler may refer to:
 Alfred Steckler (1856–1929), American lawyer and judge
 Len Steckler (1928–2016), American photographer, painter, film director, cinematographer and producer
 Ray Dennis Steckler(1938–2009), American film director and producer
 Vince Steckler (1958–2021), American businessman
 William Elwood Steckler (1913–1995), American federal judge

See also 
 Seckler